SDP, an abbreviation of Stonedeafproduction is a German pop/hip hop duo made up of singer and producer Vincent Stein and singer and guitarist Dag-Alexis Kopplin. The duo are signed to Berliner Plattenbau label.

The band was founded in 1999 in Berlin-Spandau as Stonedeafproduction before shortening name to SDP. The band performs live with an accompanying band of musicians that changes, but mainly includes Raphael Seidel (bass), Phil Sunday (guitar), Thilo Brandt (drums) and Mad Maks (as DJ).

Vincent Stein (born 10 October 1983 in Berlin) is also known as a producer with the stage name Beatzarre who produced for German rapper like Bushido, Sido and Fler and for pop duo Ich + Ich made up of Adel Tawil and Annette Humpe and many others.

Discography

Studio albums

Live albums

Demo albums
2002: Angriff aus Berlin

EPs

Singles

Other charted songs

References

German musical duos
German hip hop groups
Musical groups from Berlin
German male guitarists